OceanaGold Corporation (OceanaGold) is a multinational, mid-tier gold mining company with significant global operating, development and exploration experience.

OceanaGold’s operating assets are located in the Philippines, New Zealand and the United States and include: the Didipio Gold-Copper Mine on Luzon Island in the Philippines; the Macraes Goldfield Mine in the South Island of New Zealand; the Waihi Gold Mine in the North Island of New Zealand; and the Haile Gold Mine located in South Carolina, United States of America.

OceanaGold is publicly listed on the Toronto Stock Exchange (TSX) under the ticker ‘OGC’ and was formerly listed on the Australian Securities Exchange.

Production
2017 was a record year of financial and operating performance for OceanaGold. For the sixth consecutive year the company achieved its full-year production and cost guidance, producing 574,606 ounces of gold, 18,351 tonnes of copper, and delivering a record revenue of $724 million (net profit after tax of $172 million).

Operations
OceanaGold owns four operating assets, these include the Macraes and Waihi Gold Mines in New Zealand, the Didipio Gold and Copper Mine in the Philippines and the Haile Gold Mine in the United States of America. Each of the company’s operating assets holds additional growth potential.

New Zealand
The Macraes Goldfield is an open pit and underground operation in Otago in the South Island of New Zealand. New Zealand’s largest gold producing operation, it has produced over 4 million ounces of gold to date. Macraes produced 160, 266 ounces of gold in 2017.

The Waihi Gold Mine is an underground operation in Waikato in the North Island of New Zealand. In March 2018 the company announced the commencement of the resource consenting process to construct and operate a new underground mine. Waihi produced 119,084 ounces of gold in 2017.

Philippines
The Didipio Gold-Copper Mine is an underground operation in Nueva Vizcaya, Luzon. Didipio produced 176,790 ounces of gold and 18,351 tonnes of copper in 2017. Didipio has been internationally recognized for exceptional safety, environment and social development performance. Environmental and indigenous people's groups have alleged that mining operations in Nueva Vizcaya have depleted drinking water and contaminated surface water. Concerns were also raised regarding labor issues, human rights, and land acquisition. The company responded to each of the allegations made against them in correspondence with the Special Procedures branch of the UN Office of the High Commission for Human Rights (OHCHR).  After being banned from operating in 2019, Oceana Gold was able to renew its permit to operate in 2021 amid opposition from the Nueva Vizcaya local government, environmental and human rights groups, and the Catholic Bishops' Conference of the Philippines.

United States
OceanaGold acquired the Haile Gold Mine in South Carolina as an exploration project in 2015. Construction was completed in 2016 and Haile achieved commercial production in October 2017. Haile is an open pit operation (with additional underground resources), and produced 118,466 ounces of gold in 2017.

Closed sites

El Salvador
OceanaGold acquired the El Dorado Project in El Salvador in late 2013 through the acquisition of Pacific Rim Mining Corporation. El Dorado operated as an underground mine from 1948 to 1953. At the time of its purchase by OceanaGold and today, El Dorado has been an exploration project and has not been an operating mine since 1953. OceanaGold has closed the El Dorado project and does not plan future investments in El Salvador.

New Zealand
The mine at Reefton on the West Coast of the South Island opened in 2007. It closed in 2016. The Reefton Restoration Project is a comprehensive closure and rehabilitation program currently underway at the site. Rehabilitation works to date have included ground preparation, including waste rock reshaping, backfilling operations and seedling coverage.

Carbon footprint
OceanaGold reported Total CO2e emissions (Direct + Indirect) for 31 December 2020 at 232 Kt (-16 /-6.6% y-o-y). There is little evidence of a consistent declining trend as yet.

See also
Gold as an investment
Otago Gold Rush

References

External links

Companies listed on the Toronto Stock Exchange
Gold mining companies of Australia
Gold mining companies of Canada
Copper mining companies of Australia
Companies formerly listed on the Australian Securities Exchange